Saša Krajnović (born 15 August 1989) is a Serbian footballer.

Born in Pakrac (SR Croatia, SFR Yugoslavia) still young he moved to Belgrade where he begin his football career by playing with lower league sides such as FK Lokomotiva Beograd, FK Lisović and FK BASK all playing in the Serbian League Belgrade, national third tier. In summer 2009 he moved to FK Zemun, however shortly after he would sign with another Belgrade club, FK Čukarički, this one being member of the Serbian SuperLiga. He gathered 6 league appearances during the 2010–11 season, however as the club finished bottom of the table it meant it would be relegated, thus Krajnović opted to accept the offer from Iranian side Shahrdari Tabriz F.C. in summer 2011. However during the following winter, he would return to Europe and join FK Borac Banja Luka playing in the Bosnian Premier League.

References

Living people
1989 births
People from Pakrac
Serbs of Croatia
Serbian footballers
Serbian expatriate footballers
Association football defenders
Association football midfielders
FK BASK players
FK Zemun players
FK Čukarički players
Serbian First League players
Serbian SuperLiga players
FK Borac Banja Luka players
Shahrdari Tabriz players
Serbian expatriate sportspeople in Iran
Expatriate footballers in Iran
Serbian expatriate sportspeople in Libya
Expatriate footballers in Libya
FK Banat Zrenjanin players
FK Sinđelić Beograd players
Olympic Azzaweya SC players
Libyan Premier League players